Lethe insana, the common forester, is a species of Satyrinae butterfly found in the  Indomalayan realm The larva feeds on Arundinaria falcata

Subspecies
L. i. insana  Northwest India, Bhutan, Sikkim, Nepal, Assam to Indo China
L. i. procris  Leech, 1891   Thailand, Laos, Vietnam
L. i. formosana  Fruhstorfer, 1908   Taiwan
L. i. brisanda  de Nicéville, 1886   Bhutan, Assam, Northeast Burma
L. i. baucis   Leech, 1891   West China, Central China

References

insana
Butterflies of Asia
Butterflies of Indochina